Micardia pulchra is a species of moth of the family Noctuidae first described by Arthur Gardiner Butler in 1878. It is found in Korea and Japan.

References

Moths described in 1878
Acontiinae
Moths of Japan